António Salvador (born June 21, 1966) is a retired male long-distance runner from Portugal. He set his personal best in the men's marathon on April 5, 1998, in the Paris Marathon, clocking 2:12:39.

Achievements

References

1966 births
Living people
Portuguese male long-distance runners
Portuguese male marathon runners